USHUS is an integrated sonar system developed by the Naval Physical and Oceanographic Laboratory (NPOL) of the Defence Research and Development Organisation (DRDO), India, for use in submarines of the Indian Navy. It is primarily designed to be used in Sindhughosh class submarines, though it is reported to be fitted in the Arihant-class nuclear-powered ballistic missile submarines as well. USHUS is reported to be superior to its Russian equivalents.

Design and description 
USHUS is used for detecting and tracking enemy submarines, surface vessels, and torpedoes and can be used for underwater communication and avoiding obstacles. The sonar can work in both active and passive mode, and is capable of interception and underwater communication. It can detect both surface ships and submarines at a range of a few kilometres. The team developing the sonar was awarded the Agni Award for self-reliance by the Indian Prime Minister in May 2007.

Production 
The production of the sonar is done by Bharat Electronics (BEL) at its Bengaluru unit, after transfer of technology from NPOL. NPOL continues to provide technical consultancy and support. The Indian Ministry of Defence signed a contract worth ₹167 crore with BEL for the delivery of the sonars for four Kilo-class submarines between 2003 and 2007. Initially one sonar system was installed and integrated in Russia and other system was installed on board an Indian submarine.

CAG report 
A CAG audit report filed in December 2012 criticised the program for the delays, and mentioned that by then, only three submarines were upgraded with the sonar, and two of those had completed sea trials. The report also stated that due to delays in implementing the upgrade, a large portion of the sonar's technical life had expired. In 2005, two submarines were outfitted, of which one completed sea trial in January 2011. In 2008, the third submarine was upgraded and it completed the trial in December 2011.

Current status 
Indian Nuclear Submarine Project starting with INS Arihant (ATV-1) include the advanced USHUS sonar system.

By April 2013, five Sindhughosh class submarines of the navy were upgraded to include the USHUS system. They are, in order of their upgrade: Sindhuvir, Sindhuratna, Sindugosh, Sinduvijay and Sindhurakshak. INS Sindhukirti was upgraded in India at Hindustan Shipyard. The remaining submarines of the class are expect to follow.

See also 
Panchendriya (sonar)

References 

Military equipment of India
Indian Navy
Sonar
Navigational equipment